Heer Ranjha (or Heer and Ranjha) (ਹੀਰ ਰਾਂਝਾ ) is one of several popular tragic romances of Punjab, other important ones being "Sohni Mahiwal", "Mirza Sahiban" and "Sassi Punnhun". There are several poetic narrations of the story, the most famous being Heer by Waris Shah written in 1766. It tells the story of the love between Heer Sial and Dheedo Ranjha.

History
Heer Ranjha was written by many poets. Damodar Gulati, who also known as  Damodar Das Arora, claims to be the eyewitness of this tale. His Qissa/story is deemed the oldest and the first Heer in Punjabi literature . He states in the poem that he is from Jhang—the home of Heer, one of the poem's two main characters. 16th century poet Shah Hussain also used story in his "Kafi" (poetry). Some historian said this story has came from Persia and other claimed word Heer was inspired by Greek goddess Hera. Some historians say that the story was the original work of Waris Shah, others say that Heer and Ranjha were real personalities who lived under the Lodi dynasty of the 15th and 16th century and that Waris Shah later utilized these personalities for his novel that he wrote in 1766. Waris Shah states that the story has a deeper meaning, referring to the unrelenting quest that man has towards God.

Plot

Heer (Izzat bibi) was an extremely beautiful woman, born into a wealthy Muslim family of Sial Jatts and Dheedo Ranjha of the Ranjha tribe of Jatts, is the youngest of four brothers and lives in the village of Takht Hazara by the river Chenab in Punjab. Being his father's favourite son, unlike his brothers who had to toil in the lands, he led a life of ease, playing the flute ('Wanjhli'/'Bansuri'). After the death of Ranjha's father, Mauju Chaudhry, Ranjha has a quarrel with his brothers over land, and leaves home. In Waris Shah's version of the epic, Ranjha leaves home because his brothers' wives refused to give and serve him food. Eventually he arrives in Heer's village and falls in love with her. Heer's father offers Ranjha a job herding his cattle. Heer becomes mesmerized by the way Ranjha plays his flute and eventually falls in love with him. They meet each other secretly for many years until they are caught by Heer's jealous uncle, Kaido, and her parents Chuchak and Malki. Heer is forced by her family and the local priest or 'Maulvi' to marry another man named Saida Khera.

Ranjha is heartbroken. He wanders the countryside alone, until eventually he meets a Shaiva Jogi (ascetic). After meeting Gorakhnath, the founder of the "Kanphata" (pierced ear) sect of jogis at Tilla Jogian (the 'Hill of Ascetics', located 80 kilometres north of the historic town of Bhera, Sargodha District, Punjab), Ranjha becomes a jogi himself, piercing his ears and renouncing the material world. While reciting the name of the Lord, he wanders all over Punjab, eventually finding the village where Heer now lives.

The two return to Heer's village, where Heer's parents agree to their marriage - though some versions of the story state that the parents' agreement is only a deception. On the wedding day, Kaido poisons her food so that the wedding will not take place, in order to punish the girl for her behaviour. Hearing this news, Ranjha rushes to aid Heer, but is too late, as she has already eaten the poison and has died. Brokenhearted once again, Ranjha eats the remaining poisoned food and dies by her side.

Heer and Ranjha are buried in Heer's hometown, Jhang. Love-smitten couples and others often pay visits to their mausoleum.

Legacy and influence
Heer Ranjha is part of the Qissa genre of tragic love stories, along with tales such as Laila Majnu and Sassui Punnhun.

Because its plot involves a romance opposed by family members and ends with the two lovers dying, the story is often compared to the Shakespeare play Romeo and Juliet.

In popular culture
The epic poem has been made into several feature films between 1928 and 2013.

In 2013, the television serial Heer Ranjha, directed by Shahid Zahoor and produced by Yousuf Salahuddin, aired on PTV Home. Heer Ranjha is a 2020 Indian Punjabi-language period drama television series starring Amaninder Pal Singh and Sara Gurpal in the lead roles. It aired on Zee Punjabi and is based on the folktale of Heer and Ranjha.

In music
Bally Jagpal British musician has a song dedicated to their story. ‘RANJHA’ (sad love song).

The British musician Panjabi MC references the tale of Heer and Ranjha in his 2003 song Jogi. It has been sung by various Pakistani singers, including the classical/traditional artist Ghulam Ali.

The tale is mentioned in popular Bollywood songs such as "Ranjha" by Rupesh Kumar Ram from the movie Queen ,"Ranjha Ranjha" by Rekha Bhardwaj and Javed Ali from the movie Raavan and "Dariya" from the movie Baar Baar Dekho.

The names of Heer and Ranjha have been referred in the song lyrics of "One Love:  The Taj Anthem" by A.R. Rahman.

Alam Lohar is renowned for reciting Heer in various styles and one of the first international folk singers to bring this story in a song format.

The song Khaireyan De Naal from Shafqat Amanat Ali's debut solo album, Tabeer (2008), tells the tale of Heer Ranjha. 

One of the songs of 2012 Hindi film Jab Tak Hai Jaan has been named "Heer".

Also, the 2018 Hindi film Race 3 has a song named "Heeriye" which refers to Heer and Ranjha.

In 2020, popular Indian YouTuber Bhuvan Bam wrote and sang "Heer Ranjha". The song depicts the brutal customs of society in the Indian subcontinent and has garnered more than 10 million views.

Gallery

See also
Muna Madan
Damodar Das Arora
Sassi Punnun
Trilok Singh Chitarkar 
Sri Charitropakhyan

References

External links
Documentary on Heer Ranjha Kamran Saqi Documentary Film on Heer Ranjha Produced by Kamran Saqi - Royal News
Read Online Heer Waris Shah By Peeran Dita Targarh in Urdu language.
Complete Heer Waris Shah in Shahmukhi language.
Qissa Heer Waris Shah in Unicode Punjabi language.

 
Punjabi culture
Punjabi folklore
Punjabi literature
Sufi literature
1766 novels
Literary duos
Tragedies (dramas)
Indian folklore
Indian literature
Love stories
Pakistani folklore
Pakistani literature